John James Doran (July 6, 1864 – February 16, 1904) was a Boatswain's Mate, 2nd Class in the United States Navy during the Spanish–American War.

Biography
He received the Medal of Honor for extraordinary bravery and coolness under heavy fire from the enemy while cutting the cables leading from Cienfuegos, Cuba, May 11, 1898.

Namesake
Two ships, were named for him. An elementary school in Fall River, Massachusetts is also named for him, as was a former second annex school to the first.

Medal of Honor citation
On board the  during the operation of cutting the cable leading from Cienfuegos, Cuba, 11 May 1898. Facing the heavy fire of the enemy, Doran set an example of extraordinary bravery and coolness throughout this action.

See also

 List of Medal of Honor recipients for the Spanish–American War
 The Hiker (Fall River, Massachusetts)

References

 

1864 births
1904 deaths
United States Navy Medal of Honor recipients
American military personnel of the Spanish–American War
United States Navy non-commissioned officers
People from Boston
Spanish–American War recipients of the Medal of Honor